The Tibetan serin (Spinus thibetanus) or Tibetan siskin is a true finch species (family Fringillidae).

Taxonomy and systematics
The Tibetan serin was formerly placed in the genus Serinus but was assigned to the genus Spinus based on a phylogenetic analysis of mitochondrial and nuclear DNA sequences.

The first description of the species was by the British ornithologist Allan Octavian Hume in 1872 under the binomial name Chrysomitris thibetanus. In the 19th century, it was also referred to as the Sikkim siskin.

Description
The Tibetan siskin lacks yellow panels on its wings in all plumages. Adult males have olive-greenish upper parts, yellow underparts, yellowish-green rumps, yellow supercilium and border behind ear-coverts. Wing and tail feathers of this bird species are broadly differentiated by a yellowish-green color. Adult females of this species have black streaking on darker greyish-green upper parts, more clearly defined wing-bars than their male counterparts, paler yellowish throats and black-flanked breasts with streaking. Juveniles are duller green, tinged brownish-buff on upper parts, with duller rumps, buff fringes to greater coverts and paler or heavily streaked underparts.

Distribution
This species is found in Bhutan, China, India, Myanmar, and Nepal. Its natural habitat is temperate forests. It spends the winter in the central and eastern Himalayas. A group of birders from West Bengal discovered its presence in Hee Village near Varsey Rhododendron Sanctuary, Sikkim, India in the month of March 2013.

Habitat
Tibetan serins generally breed in mixed forest and spend their winter in alder.

Voice
Their soft chattering sound is much like twang twang.

References

Spinus (genus)
Birds of Tibet
Birds described in 1872
Taxonomy articles created by Polbot